Vjesnik was a Croatian state-owned daily newspaper published in Zagreb. Originally established in 1940 as a wartime illegal publication of the Communist Party of Croatia, it later built and maintained a reputation as Croatia's newspaper of record during most of its post-war history. It ceased publication in April 2012. "Tiskara Vjesnik" and "Vjesnik d.d." were the namesakes of the Vjesnik'''s printing office and publishing house, respectively.

During World War II and the Nazi-allied Independent State of Croatia regime which controlled the country, the paper served as the primary media publication of the Yugoslav Partisans movement. The August 1941 edition of the paper featured the statement "Smrt fašizmu, sloboda narodu" (transl. "Death to fascism, freedom to the people") on the cover, which was afterwards accepted as the official slogan of the entire resistance movement and was often quoted in post-war Yugoslavia.

Its heyday was between 1952 and 1977 when its Wednesday edition (Vjesnik u srijedu or VUS) regularly achieved circulations of 100,000 and was widely read across Yugoslavia.

Following Croatia's independence and the breakup of Yugoslavia in the early 1990s its circulation steadily began to dwindle, as Vjesnik came under the control of the Croatian Democratic Union (HDZ), at the time the ruling conservative party. Ever since the 1990s, Vjesnik was seen as always taking a pro-government editorial stance, and it even changed its name briefly in 1992 to Novi Vjesnik in an attempt to distance itself from its own communist history. The name, however, proved to be unpopular and was changed back that same year.

A sharp drop in average daily circulation occurred from 1997 (21,348) to 2005 (9,660) down from over 100,000 in 1960.

In early 2012 the paper ran into serious financial difficulties, and in April it ceased printing.Ugašen zagrebački "Vjesnik"  By May 2012 Vjesnik'' operated only as a web portal. By 12 June 2012, the web portal was still accessible, but it was no longer updated, and in July 2012 the website was defunct.

Editors-in-chief

Šerif Šehović (1945)
Živko Vnuk (1950)
Frane Barbieri (1950–1953)
Joško Palavršić (1953–1955)
Božidar Novak (1955–1963)
Milan Beslać (1963–1966)
Josip Vrhovec (1968–1970)
Milovan Baletić (1970–1971)
Stjepan Košarog (1971–1972)
Drago Auguštin (1972–1975)
Pero Pletikosa (1975–1983)
Davor Šošić (1983–1986)
Uroš Šoškić (1986–1987)
Stevo Maoduš (1987–1990)
Hidajet Biščević (1990–1992)
Radovan Stipetić (1992–1993)
Krešimir Fijačko (1993–1994)
Ante Ivković (1994–1996)
Nenad Ivanković (1996–2000)
Igor Mandić (2000)
Zlatko Herljević (2000–2001)
Krešimir Fijačko (2001–2004)
Andrea Latinović (2004–2005)
Darko Đuretek (2005–2010)
Bruno Lopandić (2010–2012)

References

External links
  for Tiskara Vjesnik 
  

Defunct newspapers published in Croatia
Newspapers published in Yugoslavia
Croatian-language newspapers
Mass media in Zagreb
Newspapers established in 1940
Publications disestablished in 2012
1940 establishments in Croatia
2012 disestablishments in Croatia
Buildings and structures in Zagreb
Skyscraper office buildings in Croatia
Modernist architecture in Croatia
Daily newspapers published in Croatia